Reason is a surname of Old French origin. It is the 80,274th most common surname in the world and approximately 5,465 people bear this surname. It is from the Old French "Raison", which means reasoning and intellectual faculty, and it would have been a nickname for an intelligent person.

Etymology and history 
The surname was introduced to England after the Norman Conquest of 1066, and it is an example of the sizable group of early European surnames that were created through the habitual use of nicknames.

People with the surname include:
Charles L. Reason (1818–1893), American linguist and mathematician
Dana Reason, 20th/21st-century Canadian musician
Jumbo Reason, English footballer
Patrick H. Reason (1816–1898), American lithographer and engraver
J. Paul Reason (born 1941), American naval officer

The surname Reason was first seen in Lincolnshire where they held a family seat at Market, Middle and West Rasen which was held by Bishop Odo of Bayeux.  The under- tenant holding from the Bishop was Alfred of Lincoln (a Norman noble) and conjecturally most of the Reason family in Britain are descended from him.

Variations 
Before the English dictionary and the printing press, no surnames were standardised. There were many variations, including Reason, Rasen, Rason, Rayson, Reson, Reasons, Resons, Reeson, Resen, Resun, Raysun and Rasne.

References

French-language surnames